Stiles is a ghost town in Reagan County, Texas, United States, about  north of Big Lake. As the only town in the area when Reagan County was established in 1903, Stiles was made the county seat. Bypassed by the railroad and eclipsed when oil was discovered near Big Lake, Stiles was replaced with Big Lake as the county seat in 1925.

Stiles Courthouse 
The ruins of the old 1911 Reagan County Courthouse are still visible just off Texas State Highway 137, between Big Lake and Texas State Highway 158 on Stiles Courthouse Loop. The courthouse was constructed with local stone by William Martin.

In 1998, the structure burned several times, damaging the courthouse. Ralph Denton was charged with arson for several fires in Reagan County.

Stiles Cemetery
The Stiles Cemetery is located off of SH 137 across the Centralia Draw, southwest of the courthouse.

Established about 1903. Site is on land then owned by early settlers G. W. and Lizzie Stiles. Plot summarizes much frontier history, as it holds graves of cowboys who died in accidents on cattle range; one Spanish–American War veteran; victims of shootings, rattlesnake bites, epidemic dysentery. Most were pioneers of steady habits and quiet lives. Already in use for many years, the 3-acre plot was deeded to county in 1920 by J. D. Wagner, an adventuring man who lived for years alternately in Texas and in South America.

Centralia Draw
Today, Centralia Draw remains dry most of the year except during occasional brief periods of heavy rainfall and runoff. Evidence suggests that in the past a more active spring-fed stream once flowed through Centralia Draw cutting the broad valley we see today.

See also
List of ghost towns in Texas
Llano Estacado
Concho River
Kansas City, Mexico and Orient Railway

References

External links
Photos of West Texas and the Llano Estacado
Stiles - Texas Ghost Towns
Texas Escapes - Stiles, Texas

Ghost towns in West Texas
Geography of Reagan County, Texas